Lophocampa bicolor is a moth of the family Erebidae. It was described by Francis Walker in 1855. It is found in Mexico and Big Bend National Park, Texas.

Description
Male. Reddish tawny. Head white. Proboscis tawny. Antennae whitish above. Thorax with three white stripes. Pectus white. Fore femora and fore tibiae thickly clothed with white hairs. Forewings testaceous, with indistinct hyaline spots. Hindwings white. Length of the body 7 lines; of the wings 17 lines.

References

 
Lophocampa bicolor at BOLD Systems

bicolor
Moths described in 1855